Trebizond Eyalet or Trabzon Beylerbeyliği was an eyalet of the Ottoman Empire.

Established in 1598, it remained a primarily Christian region into the 17th century, well after the rest of Anatolia had been converted to Islam.

Administrative divisions

See also
 Pontic Greeks

References

Bibliography 

Eyalets of the Ottoman Empire in Anatolia
Trabzon
1598 establishments in the Ottoman Empire
1867 disestablishments in the Ottoman Empire
Ottoman period in Georgia (country)